The 1992 Caribbean Cup (known as the Shell Caribbean Cup for sponsorship reasons) was the fourth edition of the Caribbean Cup, the football championship of the Caribbean, one of the CONCACAF zones. The final stage was hosted by Trinidad and Tobago.

Qualifying tournament

Group 1
Played in Barbados

Group 2
 played in Sint Maarten

Group 3
Played in Suriname

Group 4
Played in Saint Kitts and Nevis

Group 5
Played in Saint Lucia

Group 6

Note: There might have been another team in this group but if so, they withdrew.

Final tournament
The final tournament was held in Trinidad and Tobago.

First round

Group A

Group B

Semi-finals

3rd place match

Final

1992
Caribbean Cup
Caribbean Cup, 1992
1992